Hanley Greyhound Stadium was a greyhound racing and speedway stadium, located in Hanley, Stoke-on-Trent.

Origins
The stadium was constructed and opened in 1928, in only the second year of oval track greyhound racing in the United Kingdom. The stadium known as the Sun Street Stadium was located on the south side of Clough Street and the north side of Sun Street. It was built on top of an old pit known as Marl Pit (part of the Shelton Colliery). The stadium was situated next door to the Dresden Works.

Opening
Racing started on 31 March 1928 and took place three times a week. The racing was independent (unaffiliated to a governing body).

The independent racing lasted for 35 years.

Speedway

Speedway was an integral part of the stadium and a team known as the Hanley Potters first raced at the stadium.

Closure
The final meeting took place on 18 October 1963 after being sold to a garage business. The site today is a business park.

References

Demolished buildings and structures in England
Sports venues in Stoke-on-Trent
Defunct greyhound racing venues in the United Kingdom
Defunct speedway venues in England
Sports venues completed in 1928